Nima Alamian (born 24 December 1992 in Babol) is an Iranian table tennis player. He won at the 2016 Asian qualification tournament and qualified to the 2016 Summer Olympics.

Nima Alamian won a bronze medal in doubles event at the WTT contender series Qatar 2021.

He also booked his place at Tokyo 2020 Summer Olympics after winning a gold medal at the Asian Olympic Qualification Tournament in Doha Qatar. Nima Alamian defeated Uzbekistan's Zokida Kenjaev 4-2 (8-11, 7-11, 11-4, 11-4, 13-11, 11-7) in the final match. Alamian will represent Iran at the Games after securing top spot in the Central Asia region men’s singles event.  He has qualified to represent Iran at the 2020 Summer Olympics.

His older brother, Noshad, is table tennis player too.

Major results

References

External links 
 ITTF results

Living people
People from Babol
Iranian male table tennis players
Table tennis players at the 2016 Summer Olympics
Olympic table tennis players of Iran
Table tennis players at the 2018 Asian Games
Asian Games competitors for Iran
Table tennis players at the 2020 Summer Olympics
1992 births
Sportspeople from Mazandaran province
20th-century Iranian people
21st-century Iranian people
Islamic Solidarity Games competitors for Iran